The 1961–62 Greek Football Cup was the 20th edition the Greek Football Cup.

Tournament details

The competition began normally, but however was not completed: although the Final (between Olympiacos and Panathinaikos) was held, it was abandoned in extra time, and it was determined no Cup would be awarded that year.

In the Round of 32, the teams that had qualified to Round of 16 of previous season qualified without matches. By Alpha Ethniki teams of that year, 6 teams were entered in qualifying matches. They were PAOK, Ethnikos Piraeus, Egaleo, Niki Volos, Panelefsiniakos and Fostiras. The last two did not qualify for the Round of 32, after they were eliminated by Ethnikos and Egaleo respectively.

In the Round of 32, the teams of Central and Southern Greece were drawn against each other, as were the teams of Northern Greece, with the exception of the tie between Atromitos and Olympiacos Kozani. From the Round of 16 and afterwards, there was a draw between teams that had qualified. In two cases the winners were determined by draw, after both matches ended in a draw after extra time. Olympiacos won by 9–0 against a subpar OFI Crete team.

Finalists that year were the eternal enemies, Olympiacos and Panathinaikos. The match was played at the AEK Stadium. It was an eventful and very hard match that was marked by three red cards in a first half, which in fact lasted 66 minutes because of continuous interruptions due to crowd behaviour. The intermission lasted 30 minutes, and spectators became suspicious that both teams had arranged for a draw in order to make more money from the replay (there being no penalty shootouts at the time), hurled objects on to the pitch.

The second half went more smoothly despite the reactions of disgruntled spectators unhappy with proceedings. The scores remained tied and the match went to extra time. However, with the 21 minutes of delays at the beginning of the match, darkness set in (there were no floodlights in the stadium), so the Swiss referee abandoned the game.

The HFF, fearful of reactions, declined to arrange a replay, so while there was a Cup Final, there was no Cup winner. In the European Cup Winners' Cup of next season Olympiacos were entered, while Panathinaikos were the champions of that year, and therefore entered the European Cup competition.

Calendar
From Round of 32 onwards:

Knockout phase
In the knockout phase, teams play against each other over a single match. If the match ends up as a draw, extra time will be played and if the match remains a draw a replay match is set at the home of the guest team which the extra time rule stands as well. If a winner doesn't occur after the replay match the winner emerges by a flip of a coin, except from the final.The mechanism of the draws for each round is as follows:
In the draw for the round of 32, the teams that had qualified to previous' season Round of 16 are seeded and the clubs that passed the qualification round are unseeded.The teams of Central and Southern Greece were drawn against each other, as were the teams of Northern Greece, with the exception of one match.
In the draws for the round of 16 onwards, there are no seedings, and teams from the same group can be drawn against each other.

Bracket

Round of 32

||colspan="2" rowspan="12" 

||colspan="2" 

||colspan="2" 
|}

Round of 16

||colspan="2" rowspan="2" 

||colspan="2" 

||colspan="2" rowspan="3" 

|}

*Qualified after draw.

Quarter-finals

|}

Semi-finals

||colspan="2" 

|}

Final

The 20th Greek Cup Final was played at the AEK Stadium. The game was abandoned at 97th minute due to darkness, as stadium had no lights at that time period. The HFF declined to reschedule the Final due to the fan behaviour after the match was abandoned.

References

External links
Greek Cup 1961-62 at RSSSF

Greek Football Cup seasons
Greek Cup
Cup